Skirting can refer to:
Construction elements
Baseboards
Molding (decorative)
protective devices such as lift table bellows
vinyl elements that covers the crawl space under a mobile home
Skirt steaks, also known as beef skirting
skirting, cloth used to decorate, cover, or hide tables or chairs from view, often used in exhibitions
in sheep shearing skirting refers to cleaning the fleece from unwanted parts